Toledo Township may refer to the following townships in the United States:

 Toledo Township, Tama County, Iowa
 Toledo Township, Chase County, Kansas